Nelina Georgieva (born 8 April 1997) is a Bulgarian pop singer from the Bulgarian city of Kazanlak. She was the lead vocal of Deep Zone Project from 2015 until early 2018.

Biography

Early career
Nelina was born in Kazanlak, Bulgaria. Her father, Lyudmil is a musician and her mother, Sonya, is a hairdresser. She has an older brother. Georgieva studies in Music School "Lyubomir Pipkov" in Sofia. She started singing at the age of 4 and has been playing piano since the age of 5. When she was 7 she became Mini Miss Rose Queen.

Georgieva was part of the second season of X Factor. She left the show in week 11 on 5th place.

Deep Zone Project
On 14 March 2015 it was announced that Nelina join the Bulgarian house/electro band Deep Zone Project as a lead vocals. Her contract with Deep Zone Project only lasted for three years. In January 2018, she announced that she left the band to focus on her solo career.

Solo career
After leaving Deep Zone Project, Nelina started to focus on her solo career. Her debut single as a solo singer, "Deja Vu", was released on her YouTube channel on June 28, 2018. Her second single, "Рай" was released on April 25, 2019. on her YouTube channel.

Discography

References

External links
 X Factor profile

1997 births
Living people
People from Kazanlak
Bulgarian pop singers
The X Factor contestants
X Factor (Bulgarian TV series)